Brighton is an unincorporated community in Harmony Township, Clark County, Ohio, USA.

History
Brighton was laid out in 1835. A post office called Brighton Centre was established in 1835, and remained in operation until 1843. A post office was later reestablished there under the name Orchard. The Orchard post office opened in 1890, and was discontinued in 1909.

References

Unincorporated communities in Clark County, Ohio
1835 establishments in Ohio
Populated places established in 1835
Unincorporated communities in Ohio